Ermogenis Christofi (born 21 September 1974) is a retired Cypriot football midfielder.

References

1974 births
Living people
Cypriot footballers
AEL Limassol players
Anorthosis Famagusta F.C. players
Association football midfielders
Cypriot First Division players
Cyprus international footballers